Matthew 27:53 is the fifty-third verse of the twenty-seventh chapter of the Gospel of Matthew in the New Testament. This verse describes some of the events that occurred upon the death of Jesus. The previous verse mentioned that tombs broke open and the saints inside were resurrected. In this verse the saints descend upon the Holy City.

Content
The original Koine Greek, according to Westcott and Hort, reads:
και εξελθοντες εκ των μνημειων μετα την εγερσιν αυτου 
εισηλθον εις την αγιαν πολιν και ενεφανισθησαν πολλοις

In the King James Version of the Bible it is translated as:
and coming out of the graves after His resurrection, 
they went into the holy city and appeared to many.

The modern World English Bible translates the passage as:
and coming out of the tombs after his resurrection, they 
entered into the holy city and appeared to many.

For a collection of other versions see BibleHub Matthew 27:53

Analysis
These verses see the resurrection of  "many" saints, and their appearance in the city where they are seen by "many." The concern that Biblical scholars have had for centuries with this story, is that these momentous events are mentioned nowhere else. Not only are they not noticed by any contemporary non-Christian sources, but none of the other gospel writers mentions this occurring. The author of Matthew gives no further details himself about this event. No reaction to these events is described, nor does he mention what happened to the saints after their appearance. Nolland speculates as to what happened after to the risen saints. He considers it unlikely that they simply returned to the grave after a brief time among the living, he also does not think it likely that the saints resumed their normal lives on Earth. Thus Nolland feels that Matthew probably imagines the saints being translated directly to heaven after a short time on Earth, similar to Elijah.

The text also makes no note on why there is a two-day delay between the opening of the tombs upon Jesus' death, and the saints' appearance in the city only after Jesus' resurrection. If these events only happen two days hence, why are they mentioned here and not with the miraculous events of the resurrection at Matthew 28:2? Some later manuscripts have "after their resurrection" rather than "his," rearranging the timeline. Schweizer speculates that this verse contains an ancient correction to Matthew's original manuscript. Theologically Jesus had to be the first person resurrected, so Schweizer believes the wording of this verse was switched to ensure the saints only rose after Jesus.

Most modern scholars thus do not consider these events to be historical. Bultmann refers to them as "pure novelistic motifs." Hagnar states that these events make more theological than historical sense. Brown comments that the strength of this part of the narrative is "atmosphere, not details." There have been attempts to reconcile this verse with other sources. One proposition is that by the "holy city" Matthew is not referring to Jerusalem, but rather to heaven. The saints thus appeared only in heaven, explaining why no other source makes note of this event. Most scholars reject this understanding, as "holy city" has referred to Jerusalem throughout Matthew's gospel (such as at Matthew 4:5). The theory also fails to explain what is meant when Matthew states they were "seen by many."

References

Sources
 
 

27:53